The Fox and Goose Ground was a cricket ground in Coalville, Leicestershire. Linked with the nearby Fox & Goose public house (now demolished), the ground was used as an outground by Leicestershire in 1913 and 1914. First-class cricket was played at the ground twice, with Leicestershire playing against Worcestershire in the 1913 and 1914 County Championship's, with Leicestershire winning both matches. Following the First World War, Leicestershire did not return to the ground. Cricket is no longer played at the ground, which is still in use as a recreation ground and is now known as Scotlands Playing Fields.

First-class records
 Highest team total: 507 all out by Leicestershire v Worcestershire, 1914
 Lowest team total: 223 all out by Worcestershire v Leicestershire, 1914
 Highest individual innings: 227* by John King for Leicestershire v Worcestershire, 1914
 Best bowling in an innings: 7–58 by George Geary for Leicestershire v Worcestershire, 1913
 Best bowling in a match: 11–112 by George Geary, Leicestershire v Worcestershire, 1914

See also
List of Leicestershire County Cricket Club grounds
List of cricket grounds in England and Wales

References

Defunct cricket grounds in England
Cricket grounds in Leicestershire
North West Leicestershire District
Defunct sports venues in Leicestershire
Leicestershire County Cricket Club